Habibur Rehman (15 August 1925 – 19 January 1984) was a Pakistani field hockey player. He competed at the 1952 Summer Olympics and the 1956 Summer Olympics, winning a silver medal at the 1956 Olympics.

References

External links
 

1925 births
1984 deaths
Pakistani male field hockey players
Olympic field hockey players of Pakistan
Field hockey players at the 1952 Summer Olympics
Field hockey players at the 1956 Summer Olympics
Place of birth missing
Olympic silver medalists for Pakistan
Olympic medalists in field hockey
Medalists at the 1956 Summer Olympics
Field hockey players from Bhopal
Indian emigrants to Pakistan
Muhajir people
Asian Games medalists in field hockey
Field hockey players at the 1958 Asian Games
Asian Games gold medalists for Pakistan
Medalists at the 1958 Asian Games
20th-century Pakistani people